Araotes lapithis, the witch, is a small butterfly found in the Indomalayan realm that belongs to the lycaenids or blues family. The species was first described by Frederic Moore in 1857.

Subspecies
A. l. lapithis Sikkim, Assam - South China, West Thailand, Myanmar
A. l. uruwela Fruhstorfer, 1912 southern Thailand, Peninsular Malaya, Langkawi, Singapore, Borneo
A. l. arianus Fruhstorfer, 1912 Palawan
A. l. decolor Fruhstorfer, 1899 Nias
A. l. archytas Fruhstorfer, 1912 Java

References

 
 

Butterflies of Asia
Deudorigini
Taxa named by Frederic Moore
Butterflies described in 1857